Rising Wolf Mountain is located in the Lewis Range, Glacier National Park in the U.S. state of Montana. The Blackfeet consider the Two Medicine region of the park to be sacred ground and their name for the peak, "Mahkuyi-opuahsin", meaning, The way the wolf gets up, was later translated to the current name of the mountain.

Rising Wolf Mountain was named after Hugh Monroe, a fur trader who lived with the Pikunis and gave him the name Rising Wolf.  After his death, his close friend and author James Willard Schultz named the peak after Monroe.

Climate
Based on the Köppen climate classification, the peak is located in an alpine subarctic climate zone with long, cold, snowy winters, and cool to warm summers. Temperatures can drop below −10 °F with wind chill factors below −30 °F.

Geology

Like other mountains in Glacier National Park, the peak is composed of sedimentary rock laid down during the Precambrian to Jurassic periods.

Gallery

See also
 List of mountains and mountain ranges of Glacier National Park (U.S.)

References

Rising Wolf Mountain
Mountains of Glacier National Park (U.S.)
Lewis Range